Pinanga is a genus of flowering plant of the palm family in the subtribe Arecinae.  It is native to eastern and southern Asia (India, China, Indo-China, Malesia) across to New Guinea.

Species
Accepted species:

 Pinanga acaulis Ridl.
 Pinanga acuminata A.J.Hend.
 Pinanga adangensis Ridl.
 Pinanga albescens Becc.
 Pinanga andamanensis Becc.
 Pinanga angustisecta Becc.
 Pinanga annamensis Magalon
 Pinanga arinasae Witono
 Pinanga aristata (Burret) J.Dransf.
 Pinanga arundinacea Ridl.
 Pinanga auriculata Becc.
 Pinanga badia Hodel
 Pinanga basilanensis Becc.
 Pinanga batanensis Becc.
 Pinanga baviensis Becc.
 Pinanga bicolana Fernando
 Pinanga borneensis Scheff.
 Pinanga brevipes Becc.
 Pinanga caesia Blume
 Pinanga capitata Becc.
 Pinanga cattienensis Andr.Hend., N.K.Ban & N.Q.Dung
 Pinanga celebica Scheff.
 Pinanga chaiana J.Dransf.
 Pinanga cleistantha J.Dransf.
 Pinanga copelandii Becc.
 Pinanga coronata Blume
 Pinanga crassipes Becc.
 Pinanga cucullata J.Dransf.
 Pinanga cupularis A.J.Hend., N.K.Ban & N.Q.Dung
 Pinanga curranii Becc.
 Pinanga declinata A.J.Hend., N.K.Ban & N.Q.Dung
 Pinanga decora L.Linden & Rodigas
 Pinanga densiflora Becc.
 Pinanga dicksonii Blume
 Pinanga disticha Blume
 Pinanga dumetosa J.Dransf.
 Pinanga egregia Fernando
 Pinanga forbesii Ridl.
 Pinanga fractiflexa Hodel
 Pinanga furfuracea Blume
 Pinanga geonomiformis Becc.
 Pinanga glauca Ridl.
 Pinanga glaucifolia Fernando
 Pinanga globulifera Merr.
 Pinanga globulifera Blume
 Pinanga gracilis Blume
 Pinanga gracillima Merr.
 Pinanga grandijuga Burret
 Pinanga grandis Burret
 Pinanga griffithii Becc.
 Pinanga heterophylla Becc.
 Pinanga hexasticha Kurz
 Pinanga hookeriana Becc.
 Pinanga humilis A.J.Hend., N.K.Ban & N.Q.Dung
 Pinanga hymenospatha Hook.f.
 Pinanga inaequalis Blume
 Pinanga insignis Becc.
 Pinanga isabelensis Becc.
 Pinanga jamariensis C.K.Lim
 Pinanga jambusana C.K.Lim
 Pinanga javana Blume
 Pinanga johorensis C.K.Lim & Saw
 Pinanga keahi Furtado
 Pinanga kontumensis A.J.Hend., N.K.Ban & N.Q.Dung
 Pinanga lacei A.J.Hend.
 Pinanga latisecta Blume
 Pinanga lepidota Rendle
 Pinanga ligulata Becc.
 Pinanga limbangensis C.K.Lim
 Pinanga limosa Ridl.
 Pinanga macrospadix Burret
 Pinanga maculata Porte ex Lem.
 Pinanga malaiana Scheff.
 Pinanga manii Becc.
 Pinanga megalocarpa Burret
 Pinanga micholitzii Hort.
 Pinanga minor Blume
 Pinanga minuta Furtado
 Pinanga mirabilis Becc.
 Pinanga modesta Becc.
 Pinanga mooreana J.Dransf.
 Pinanga negrosensis Becc.
 Pinanga nuichuensis A.J.Hend., N.K.Ban & B.V.Thanh
 Pinanga pachycarpa Burret
 Pinanga pachyphylla J.Dransf.
 Pinanga palustris Kiew
 Pinanga pantiensis J.Dransf.
 Pinanga paradoxa (Griff.) Scheff.
 Pinanga parvula Ridl.
 Pinanga patula Blume
 Pinanga pectinata Becc.
 Pinanga perakensis Becc.
 Pinanga philippinensis Becc.
 Pinanga pilosa (Burret) J.Dransf.
 Pinanga piscatorum Pierre ex Gagnep.
 Pinanga plicata A.J.Hend.
 Pinanga polymorpha Becc.
 Pinanga porrecta Burret
 Pinanga pulchella Burret
 Pinanga purpurea Hendra
 Pinanga quadrijuga Gagnep.
 Pinanga ridleyana Becc. ex Furtado
 Pinanga rigida Becc.
 Pinanga riparia Ridl.
 Pinanga rivularis Becc.
 Pinanga rumphiana (Mart.) J.Dransf. & Govaerts
 Pinanga rupestris J.Dransf.
 Pinanga salicifolia Blume
 Pinanga samarana Becc.
 Pinanga sarmentosa Saw
 Pinanga sclerophylla Becc.
 Pinanga scortechinii Becc.
 Pinanga sessilifolia Furtado
 Pinanga sibuyanensis Becc.
 Pinanga sierramadreana Fernando
 Pinanga simplicifrons (Miq.) Becc.
 Pinanga singaporensis Ridl.
 Pinanga sobolifera Fernando
 Pinanga speciosa Becc.
 Pinanga spectabilis Bull
 Pinanga stricta Becc.
 Pinanga stylosa Becc.
 Pinanga subintegra Ridl.
 Pinanga subruminata Becc.
 Pinanga sylvestris (Lour.) Hodel
 Pinanga tashiroi Hayata
 Pinanga tenacinervis J.Dransf.
 Pinanga tenella Scheff.
 Pinanga tomentella Becc.
 Pinanga tomentosa A.J.Hend.
 Pinanga trichoneura Becc.
 Pinanga uncinata Burret
 Pinanga urdanetana Becc. ex Martelli
 Pinanga urdanetensis Becc.
 Pinanga urosperma Becc.
 Pinanga variegata Becc.
 Pinanga veitchii H.Wendl.
 Pinanga versicolor A.J.Hend.
 Pinanga watanaiana C.K.Lim
 Pinanga woodiana Becc.
 Pinanga yassinii J.Dransf.

References

 
Arecaceae genera
Taxonomy articles created by Polbot